Esperiopsidae is a family of marine demosponges.

Genera
The World Register of Marine Species includes four genera:
 Amphilectus Vosmaer, 1880
 Esperiopsis Carter, 1882
 Semisuberites Carter, 1877
 Ulosa Laubenfels, 1936

References 

 
Sponge families